The 2019 Boston Cannons season will be the nineteenth season for the Boston Cannons of Major League Lacrosse. Sean Quirk enters his fourth season as head coach, after leading the team to a 5-9 record in 2018, which was a two-win improvement from 2017. 2019 will be the team's first summer at Veterans Memorial Stadium in Quincy after most recently playing at Harvard Stadium. With this move, the team will invest $1.5 million in stadium expansion and improvements, bringing capacity up to 5,000.

Transactions

Offseason
February 15, 2019 - The Cannons ship face-off specialist Nathan Farrell and the 39th overall pick of the 2019 collegiate draft to the Atlanta Blaze in exchange for defenseman James Leary.
March 21 - Two players, midfielder Jay Drapeau and defenseman Bill O'Brien, are selected in the second supplemental draft.
March 25 - The Cannons sign free agent long stick midfielders Drew Bourdeau and Jimmy Cunningham.

In-season
July 19 - The Cannons trade attackman Shawn Evans to the Dallas Rattlers in exchange for a third round draft pick in the 2020 collegiate draft.

Collegiate Draft
The 2019 Collegiate Draft was held on March 9 in Charlotte, North Carolina at the NASCAR Hall of Fame. Inside Lacrosse gave the Cannons a "C−" in their team-by-team draft grades, the lowest mark received by any team.

Top draft selection and third overall pick Zach Goodrich officially signed with the Cannons on May 19. Goodrich chose the Cannons over Chrome Lacrosse Club of the Premier Lacrosse League, who also selected Goodrich third in their respective draft.

Schedule

Regular season

Broadcast
On March 28, the Cannons announced that all 16 regular season games will be broadcast on NBC Sports Boston, 11 of them being produced live.

Standings

References

External links
 Team Website

Major League Lacrosse seasons
Boston Cannons